Taha Yasseri (born 6 September 1984) is a physicist and sociologist known for his research on Wikipedia and computational social science. He is an associate professor at the School of Sociology at University College Dublin, Ireland. He was formerly a senior research fellow in computational social science at the Oxford Internet Institute (OII), University of Oxford, a Turing Fellow at the Alan Turing Institute for data science, and a research fellow in humanities and social sciences at Wolfson College, Oxford. Yasseri is one of the leading scholars in computational social science and his research has been widely covered in mainstream media. Yasseri obtained his PhD in theoretical physics of complex systems at the age of 25 from  the University of Göttingen, Germany.

Education

Research and career
Yasseri's research investigates complex systems, computational social science, network science, social data science and human dynamics.

Wikipedia
Yasseri has studied the statistical trends of systemic bias at Wikipedia introduced by editing conflicts and their resolution. His research examined the counterproductive work behavior of edit warring. Yasseri contended that simple reverts or "undo" operations were not the most significant measure of counterproductive behavior at Wikipedia and relied instead on the statistical measurement of detecting "reverting/reverted pairs" or "mutually reverting edit pairs". Such a "mutually reverting edit pair" is defined where one editor reverts the edit of another editor who then, in sequence, returns to revert the first editor. The results were tabulated for several language versions of Wikipedia. The English Wikipedia's three largest conflict rates belonged to the articles George W. Bush, Anarchism and Muhammad. By comparison, for the German Wikipedia, the three largest conflict rates at the time of the study were for the articles covering Croatia, Scientology and 9/11 conspiracy theories.

In a study published by PLoS ONE in 2012 he estimated the share of contributions to different editions of Wikipedia from different regions of the world. It reported that the proportion of the edits made from North America was 51% for the English Wikipedia, and 25% for the simple English Wikipedia. The Wikimedia Foundation hopes to increase the number of editors in the Global South to 37% by 2015.

Machine sociology and bots conflict
In a 2017 article titled "Even Good Bots Fight", Yasseri and his colleagues studied interactions between Wikipedia bots. Their work illustrating the unpredictable and somewhat surprising social interactions between bots, ignited a discussion on the topic of machine sociology and the human-like behaviour of systems of semi-autonomous agents such as Wikipedia bots. Drawing on complex systems theory, Yasseri argues that even simple and predictable bots with a common goal and design might show unpredictable emergent behaviour when deployed at mass scale.

Social media and politics
Yasseri has studied the role of social media in politics. He has used Wikipedia page view statistics and Google search volumes to understand and potentially predict electoral popularity in different countries. He has co-written Political Turbulence; How Social Media Shape Collective Action which was selected among the best politics books of 2016 by The Guardian and was awarded the Political Studies Association book of the year award.

TEDx
Yasseri is a TEDx Thessaloniki 2019 speaker.

References

Computational social scientists
Wikipedia researchers
Iranian physicists
British sociologists
Iranian sociologists
Academics of the University of Oxford
Academics of University College Dublin
Iranian emigrants to England
Iranian emigrants to Ireland
1984 births
Living people
21st-century British  physicists
Sharif University of Technology alumni
University of Göttingen alumni